SS Hansa may refer to:

 , a Bremen steamship sold in 1879
 , a German steamship wrecked in 1880 on her maiden voyage
 , a German tender scrapped in 1922
 , a German steamship sold in 1908
 , a Swedish passenger ship sunk in 1944
 , a German transatlantic ocean liner of 1900, scrapped in 1925, renamed Hansa in 1921
 , a British steamship in service until 1937
 , a German and then Soviet ocean liner launched 1922 and scrapped 1981, named Hansa (1935–1945)

See also
 Hansa (disambiguation)

Ship names